Francis Capper Brooke (18 September 1810 — 13 January 1886) was an English first-class cricketer and British Army officer.

The son of The Reverend Charles Brooke, he was born in September 1810 at Ufford, Suffolk. He was educated at Harrow School, where he played for the school cricket eleven and was Head of School in 1828. From Harrow he went up to Christ Church, Oxford. Brooke purchased the rank of ensign and lieutenant in the Grenadier Guards in November 1830, later purchasing the rank of captain in April 1834. Brooke made a single appearance in first-class cricket for the Marylebone Cricket Club (MCC) against Oxford University at Oxford in 1836. Batting once in the match, he opened the batting in the MCC first innings and was dismissed by J. C. Ryle for 8 runs; he did not opening the batting in the MCC second innings and was not called upon to bat, with the MCC reaching their fourth innings target of 87 for the loss of two wickets. 

Brooke was appointed a captain in the Wilford Volunteer Rifles in January 1860, before resigning his commissions in December of the same year. He was appointed High Sheriff of Suffolk in February 1869, replacing Frederick William Schreiber. He was married twice during his life, firstly to Juliana in 1839, with the marriage lasting until her death in 1840. His second marriage was to Louisa in 1852, with whom he had issue. Brooke died suddenly at Ufford in January 1886.

References

External links

1810 births
1886 deaths
People from Suffolk Coastal (district)
People educated at Harrow College
Alumni of Christ Church, Oxford
Grenadier Guards officers
English cricketers
Marylebone Cricket Club cricketers
High Sheriffs of Suffolk